Caesar Mountain is a summit in West Virginia, in the United States.

According to tradition, the summit was named after Caesar, the slave of an early settler.

References

Mountains of Pocahontas County, West Virginia
Mountains of West Virginia